Karanja is a Tehsil town under Subdivision Arvi and is taluka(code 4961) in Wardha district in the Indian state of Maharashtra.

{
  "type": "ExternalData",
  "service": "geoshape",
  "ids": "Q60443914",
  "properties": {
    "title": "Karanja Ghadge Map",
    "stroke": "#125123",
    "stroke-width": 3,
    "fill": "#2aaf4d"
  }
}
Karanja is situated at National Highway 53 (India) or Asian Highway (AH46) or National Highway 6 (India, old numbering). It's 76 km away from Nagpur and 75 km away from Amravati and 70 km away from Wardha and is almost at the centre of Metropolis Cities and so tourists, travellers, buses, travels tends to take rest. Near about 60 gram panchayat and 102 villages come under the Tehsil. Most of the Citizens are Hindus. Other than Hindus, Buddhists and Muslims have also organized. In Hinduism, most of the people belong to the caste Kshatriya, Bhoyar, Pawar. Tribals like Gond are also in large numbers. All the festival like Holi, Diwali, Dasara, Pola, Ganesh Utsav, Chhatrapati Shivaji maharaj Jayanti are all celebrated. 

In the year 2015, Karanja became a Nagar Panchayat.

The MahaOrange Plant

The MahaOrange Plant situated 2.5 km away from Karanja Ghadge is a facility for exporting Oranges and other fruits like Banana. It was active before 2009-2010 and used to export oranges but due to some unknown circumstances, the plant shut down, and so the plant was non-functional for many years and, hence, yes, it was a challenge.Though it has all major facilities for preparing the fruit for the export, it doesn't have a processing unit attached to it.It has facilities for grading, wax-coating of fruit, pre- cooling and cold storage facilities.But none of these units in the plant were functional.Hence, when Mahaorange took over the plant on January 2015, Shridhar Thakre told MSMAB to first repair the plant as said to TOI.
Cities and towns in Wardha district
Wardha district
Talukas in Maharashtra

Golibar Chowk Incident
Golibar Chowk is one of the main square in Karanja Ghadge, situated near Bus Stop. The name of the square is derived due to one of the incident regarding Gunfire
The गोळीमार or golimar(Gunfire) incident is one of the incident happened in Karanja Ghadge⁽ᴹᵒʳᵉ ᶜᶦᵗᵃᵗᶦᵒⁿ ⁿᵉᵉᵈᵉᵈ⁾.

References